Aiahole  is a village in the southern state of Karnataka, India. It is located in the Hungund taluk of Bagalkot district in Karnataka.

See also
 Bagalkot
 Districts of Karnataka

References

External links
 http://Bagalkot.nic.in/

Villages in Bagalkot district